George Lawson (1598–1678) was an English divine and writer. He was also rector of More, Shropshire.

Biography 
George Lawson was born in 1598, and educated at Puritan Emmanuel College, Cambridge. Lawson was a protégé of William Laud.

Lawson was a supporter of the parliament, and accordingly retained his rectory during the Commonwealth.

Lawson wrote to Baxter on the appearance of the latters Aphorismes of Justification, 1649, and Baxter valued his criticisms;  "especially", he writes,  "his instigating me to the study of politicks [...] did prove a singular benefit to me".  Baxter says that he had seen in manuscript arguments by Lawson in favour of taking the engagement.

He became rector of More, Shropshire, before 22 April 1686. His religious views inclined to Arminianism. He was buried at More 12 July 1678.

Lawson, who was certainly not a Yorkshireman, must be distinguished from George Lawson (1606–1670) of Moreby, son of George Lawson of Poppleton, Yorkshire, who became rector of Eykring, Northamptonshire, and who may be identical with the George Lawson who was ejected as a royalist from the vicarage of Mears Ashby, Northamptonshire, by the parliamentarians (Walker, Attempt, ii. 296), and then became schoolmaster at Houghton Conquest, Bedfordshire.

Works 
 Examination of the Political Part of Hobbes s "Leviathan," London, 1657, 12mo.
 Theo-Politica, or a Body of Divinity, London, 1659, 8vo; 2nd ed. 1705, commended by Baxter.
 Politica Sacra et Civilis.  London, 1660, 4to.
 Exposition of the Epistle to the Hebrews.  London, 1662, fol.
 Magna Charta Ecclesiæ Universalis.  London, 1686, 8vo : 3rd ed. 1687.

Notes and references

Citations

Sources

Further reading 
 Reliquiæ Baxterianæ, ed. Sylvester, 1696, pp. 107–8
 Bickersteth s Christian Student, pp. 472, 493
 Foster s Yorkshire Pedigrees
 Allibone s Dict. of Engl. Lit.

1598 births
1678 deaths
17th-century English Anglican priests
17th-century English writers
Alumni of Emmanuel College, Cambridge
Arminian ministers
Arminian writers
Year of birth uncertain